The Individual championship test grade III equestrian event at the 2004 Summer Paralympics was competed on 21 September. It was won by Deborah Criddle, representing .

Final round
21 Sept. 2004, 14:10

References

2004 Summer Paralympics events